KLOA-LP, VHF analog channel 6, was a low powered television station licensed to Inyokern, California, United States. Because the allocation of channel 6 in NTSC approximately within the lower fringes of the FM broadcast band, KLOA-LP took advantage of the station's audio carrier, broadcasting on 87.75 MHz, and marketed itself as a radio station. It aired a Classic Country format under the moniker "87.7 Country Gold". According to the Federal Communications Commission, television stations must operate both the audio and video carriers; however, the carriers are not required to "accompany" each other, meaning that the audio and video can operate independently of one another. This meant that KLOA-LP needed not broadcast any particular image, as long as they broadcast a video signal.

History
KLOA-LP was originally K61AJ, a translator station on channel 61 owned by the Indian Wells Valley TV Booster, providing over-the-air reception of KTLA to Ridgecrest, California. On January 17, 2005, the station was sold to Roy William Mayhugh, who then moved the station to channel 6, under the call sign K06AJ. It is unknown what the station broadcast, or what the station's plans were during this time. On July 30, 2007, Roy William Mayhugh sold the station to Antelope Valley area broadcaster Robert D. Adelman. Soon after, the station converted operations to a radio station and flipped to a Spanish adult contemporary format. The call letters were changed to KLOA-LP on April 11, 2012.

After the FCC mandated the shutdown of all analog low-power television stations, which also included franken-FM stations, KLOA-LP signed off nearing the mandated deadline of July 13, 2021, with the website announcing its closure and announcing listers to tune to sister station KGIL 98.5 FM in Johannesburg, California.

See also
 KOAN-LP (similar station in Anchorage, Alaska)
 KESU-LP (defunct) (similar station in Hanamaulu, Hawaii)
 KZNO-LD (similar station in Big Bear Lake, California)
 WNYZ-LP (similar station in New York City)

References

External links
Adelman Broadcasting

LOA-LP
Defunct television stations in the United States
Television channels and stations disestablished in 2021
2021 disestablishments in California
LOA-LP